Voordorp is a district in the North East of the city of Utrecht, the Netherlands. It has a population of approximately 3,000 citizens.

History 
Voordorp was named after an old church village, Voordorp, which changed its name to Blaue Capel (meaning 'blue chapel') after the local church was rebuilt and decorated in blue in 1451. It was built in the 90s as part of the last big expansion of Utrecht within the original city limits.

Facilities 
The  area of Voordorp contains a primary school, a snack bar, a cafe, a skate slope, a nursery and a cattle market. There are plans to move the cattle market to Leidsche Rijn in order accommodate expansion of the district. It borders highway A27 which is situated behind a noise barrier.

Location 
From the heart of Utrecht, it's a twenty-minute bike ride or a twelve-minute drive to Voordorp. With the line 5 bus riding through Voordorp it is possible to reach central Utrecht. 
Its streets are named after freedom fighters.

Innovation 
Recently, Voordorp was one of the first districts to get an optical fibre connection. This connection is used for internet, television and telephone.

References 
 Informative site about Voordorp

External links
 Voordorp Vooruit (Community website)

Districts in Utrecht (city)